The Russian National Wealth Fund is Russia's sovereign wealth fund. It was created after the Stabilization Fund of the Russian Federation was split into two separate investment funds on 30 January 2008.

Fund structure 
The two funds are the Reserve Fund, which is invested abroad in low-yield securities and used when oil and gas incomes fall, and the National Wealth Fund, which invests in riskier, higher return vehicles, as well as federal budget expenditures. The Reserve Fund was given $125 billion and the National Wealth Fund was given $32 billion. The fund is controlled by the Ministry of Finance. One of the fund's main responsibilities is to support the Russian pension system.

Overview 
The National Wealth Fund will receive funds from investment returns or any excess funds that the Reserve Fund produces. The Reserve Fund is capped at 10% of Russian GDP, and any funds over that will be given to the Wealth Fund. The fund also has accumulated $72.71bn (as of 1 September 2016) from taxes and duties it collects on the production and export of oil and gas.

According to the Russian Ministry of Finance, the foreign debt securities the fund can invest in must have credit ratings of AA- or higher by Fitch or Standard & Poor's, or a rating of Aa3 by Moody's. Despite this, the fund agreed to buy (on 17 December 2013) $15 billion of Ukrainian Eurobonds, despite the fact that Ukraine had lower credit ratings at the time.

The fund stands out from other global funds with it gathering investments into the national economy itself instead investing everything overseas, so it can provide a boost to the slow modernization of Russian infrastructure in a time of otherwise anemic investment. Other countries like Indonesia are following the Russian example in running a National Wealth Fund it is reported in 2020. Of course, because of a lack of a real "hard currency" reserve, the fund can quickly lose value in a case of internal crisis.

The Russian National Wealth Fund was merged in 2017 with the remaining of Russia’s sovereign Reserve Fund. The Reserve fund was built up over years with profits from oil exports but amid low oil price prices was emptied by the end of 2017 and ceased to exist.

Size of the fund and historic numbers 
Source by the Ministry of Finance of Russia:

Sanctions

Following the 2022 Russian invasion of Ukraine, several countries imposed economic sanctions on Russian banks, individuals and companies. On February 22, 2022, United States President Joe Biden announced new restrictions on activities involving the National Wealth Fund.

On October 10, 2022, Prime Minister Mishustin ordered to allocate 1 trillion rubles from the National Welfare Fund to cover the budget deficit.

See also 

 Russian Direct Investment Fund

References

Politics of Russia
Economy of Russia
Energy in Russia
Russian
Russian entities subject to the U.S. Department of the Treasury sanctions